François de Mazières (born 22 May 1960) is a French politician.

He served as a member of the National Assembly, representing Yvelines from June 2012 to June 2017. He is mayor of Versailles since March 2008.

References

1960 births
Living people
People from Tarbes
The Republicans (France) politicians
Sciences Po alumni
Paris 2 Panthéon-Assas University alumni
École nationale d'administration alumni
Mayors of places in Île-de-France
Union for French Democracy politicians
Chevaliers of the Légion d'honneur
Officiers of the Ordre des Arts et des Lettres
Deputies of the 14th National Assembly of the French Fifth Republic